Scagnostics (scatterplot diagnostics) refers to a series of measures that characterize certain properties of a point cloud in a scatter plot. The term and idea was coined by John Tukey and Paul Tukey, though they didn't publish it; later it was elaborated by Wilkinson, Anand, and Grossman. The following nine dimensions are considered:

 For the outliers in the data:
 outlying
 For the density of data points:
 skewed
 clumpy
 sparse
 striated
 For the shape of the point cloud:
 convex
 skinny
 stringy
 For trends in the data:
 monotony

References 

Statistical charts and diagrams